Schmiech is a small river in the Swabian Alb, Baden-Württemberg, Germany. Its source is a karst spring. It flows into the Danube in Ehingen.

See also
List of rivers of Baden-Württemberg

References

Rivers of Baden-Württemberg
Rivers of Germany